Wanted is a 2015 Western pornographic film directed by Stormy Daniels and produced by Wicked Pictures and Adam & Eve.

Plot
Frank Garrett (Jay Crew) is a wealthy landowner who is in love with Joanna (Anikka Albrite), a prostitute. Garrett is sick and has a short time left to live, so he hands Joanna a copy of the deed to the north end of his ranch, along with a map. Garrett dies shortly after and Joanna is wrongfully accused of murdering and attempting to rob him by Sheriff Clayton (Steven St. Croix), who orders her to be hanged. The Sheriff did so because he wanted the deed she had inherited. Meanwhile, Dani (Stormy Daniels) arrives in Diablo City for a big poker tournament, where she intends to win enough money to help her friend Birdie (Amber Rayne) save the family ranch. Dani learns about Joanna's situation from Garrett's assistant, Samuel (Eric Masterson), and Joanna's friend, Lilah (Allie Haze), when the poker game is broken up by her rowdy arrest. Dani decides to save Joanna by engaging in a shootout with Sheriff Clayton and his posse, then fleeing the town with her. Morgan (Brendon Miller), a bounty hunter, arrives as Sheriff Clayton is asking for someone to apprehend them and agrees to help. Dani had previously robbed Morgan while she was working as a prostitute on Bourbon Street in New Orleans. When Morgan locates Dani, she makes a deal with him to split her share of whatever is found at Garrett's ranch. Samuel returns home to retrieve the original deed for Garrett's land and ask his wife Sally (Jodi Taylor) to hand it to Marshal Lane (Brad Armstrong) in Yuma. The pursuit concludes in a showdown between Dani, Sheriff Clayton, and their posses.

Cast
 Steven St. Croix as Sheriff Clayton
 Anikka Albrite as Joanna
 Jay Crew as Frank Garrett
 Jessica Drake as Pearl Garrett
 Stormy Daniels as Dani
 Amber Rayne as Birdie
 Eric Masterson as Samuel
 Allie Haze as Lilah
 Brendon Miller as Morgan
 Dick Chibbles as Dale
 Cassidy Klein as Nurse Alice
 Tommy Gunn as Taza
 Mia Li as Eela
 Jodi Taylor as Sally
 Brad Armstrong as Marshal Lane
 Ryan McLane as Dani's client
 Chanel Preston as Hannah

Production
Stormy Daniels began writing the script over eight years prior to filming. The film was shot in 2015 between June 18 and June 29, although there were four off days during that time. Filming took place in Agua Dulce for three days, Malibu for two days, an old western town outside Palm Springs for a day, and Altadena for a day. The film is set in 1879 in Diablo City, Arizona, which is based on Dodge City, Kansas. Daniels spent two months researching the year 1879 in order to ensure that the film was historically accurate. Jake Jacobs and Andre Madness did the cinematography while Kylie Ireland and Andy Appleton were the art directors. Costume design was done by Brad Armstrong. Brendon Miller contributed a song, "On the Run", to the film.

Reception

Critical response 
AdultDVDTalk.com described the film as "an enormously lavish and beautiful production". The website keys in on the films elaborate and raunchy sex scenes and its filmography which it describes as "beautiful". The website gave the film a five out of five star overall rating. Another adult film reviewer called the film as "superb" and "fun". On the review aggregator The Movie DB the film holds a user score of 78% based on 162 reviews. As well as a 6.5 out of 10 stars on IMDb.

Awards and nominations

References

External links
 
 
 

2010s pornographic films
2015 Western (genre) films
2015 films
American pornographic films
American Western (genre) films
Films about prostitution in the United States
Films set in 1879
Films set in Arizona
Films set in New Orleans
Films shot in California
2010s American films